The first women in the House of Lords took their seats in 1958, forty years after women were granted the right to stand as MPs in the House of Commons. These were life peeresses appointed by the Prime Minister. Female hereditary peers were able to sit in the Lords from 1963. Female Church of England bishops have been sitting as Lords Spiritual since 2015.  

, women make up about 29 per cent of the members of the Lords, which compares with about 35 per cent of the members of the Commons.

History
Although peerages had long been created for and inherited by women, peeresses were excluded from the House of Lords until the Life Peerages Act 1958. The Act made possible the creation of peerages for life, in order to address the declining number of active members. Women were immediately eligible and four were among the first life peers appointed, including Baroness Wootton of Abinger, who was the first woman to be appointed, and Baroness Swanborough, who was the first to take her seat. However, hereditary peeresses continued to be excluded until the passage of the Peerage Act 1963; the first to take her seat was Baroness Strange of Knokin.

The first female chief whip was Baroness Llewelyn-Davies of Hastoe in 1973. Janet Young, Baroness Young was the first woman leader of the House of Lords in 1981. Brenda Hale, Baroness Hale of Richmond became the first female Law Lord in 2004.

Since the passage of the House of Lords Act 1999, hereditary peeresses remain eligible for election to the Upper House. Five were elected in 1999 among the 92 hereditary peers who continued to sit. Of these, three have since died, and the other two retired in 2014 and 2020. (Margaret of Mar, 31st Countess of Mar was the last remaining female hereditary peer in the Lords when she retired). All  of these were replaced by male hereditary peers in by-elections.

Following a change to the law in 2014 to allow women to be ordained bishops, the Lords Spiritual (Women) Act 2015 was passed, which provides that whenever a vacancy arises among the Lords Spiritual during the ten years following the Act coming into force, the vacancy has to be filled by a woman, if one is eligible. This does not apply to the five bishops who sit by right (one of whom is female).

In 2015, Rachel Treweek, Bishop of Gloucester, became the first woman to sit as a Lord Spiritual in the House of Lords due to the Act. , five women bishops sit as Lord Spirituals in the House of Lords.

The very first woman to address the House of Lords was a witness, not a peer: Mrs Elizabeth Robinson (née Hastings; 1695–1779) from Gibraltar, gave evidence and testimony about slave trafficking.

Numbers 
There are 229 female peers out of 787 (29 per cent) in the House of Lords as of December 2022, up from 199 out of 826 (24 per cent) in 2015, 176 out of 771 (23 per cent) in 2013, and 164 out of 777 (21 per cent) in 2010. Compared with the House of Commons, women make up slightly fewer of the total members of the Lords; 220 out of 650 (34 per cent) of the members of the Commons are women as of October 2020, up from 32 per cent after the 2017 General Election.

See also
 List of female members of the House of Lords
 House of Lords § Government leaders and ministers in the Lords
 List of members of the House of Lords
 Women in the House of Commons of the United Kingdom
 European countries by percentage of women in national parliaments
 Women in positions of power
 Critical mass (gender politics)
 Women in Parliaments Global Forum
 Women in government

References

Further reading

External links
 
 
 

House of Lords
Women in the United Kingdom